Étang Saumâtre (English: brackish pond) is the largest lake in Haiti and the second largest lake in the Dominican Republic and Hispaniola, after Lake Enriquillo. It is also known as Lake Azuéi (Lac Azuéi); its Taíno name was Yainagua.

Unlike its hypersaline neighbor, Étang Saumâtre is a brackish water lake. The lake supports over 100 species of waterfowl, American flamingos (Phoenicopterus ruber), American crocodiles (Crocodylus acutus), and several other fauna found nowhere else in Haiti. The color of the lake is an intense shade of blue, and it is skirted by brush and cacti.

Geography
Its eastern side is part of the border between Haiti and the Dominican Republic; the Dominican city of Jimaní is less than 1 km from the southeast end of the lake.

The lake itself is part of a chain of nearby saline lakes that lie within the valley known as the Cul-de-Sac Depression in Haiti and the Hoya de Enriquillo in the Dominican Republic. Because the region was a former marine strait, several areas of the valley are below sea level.

Étang Saumâtre is landlocked, as it has no surface outlet. It is fed by springs emanating from calcareous rocks. The western part of the lake has slightly saline water, while the eastern part has fresh water.

A sandy shore, shallow lagoons and mudflats form the eastern shore line, while the western shores have small fresh water springs and marshes. The eastern shore is state-owned, but parts of the western side of the lake are privately owned. Salinity of the lake water is now reported as 15‰ (parts per thousand). However, it was once inferred  that Azuéi's level in Haiti and the Enriquillo lake level in the adjoining Dominican Republic had registered a drop, since Columbus had visited the area more than 500 years ago. The present assessment is that the level of the lake has been rising in recent years, forcing Haitians who live in plantation residential areas ("bateyes") around the edge of the lake to seek higher ground.

Another inference drawn by a comparison between the two lakes – Azuéi and Enriquillo – which are in the same area and have the same origin is that though they are considered "twins," they are two dissimilar bodies of water. Azuéi has a stable shore line, its waters are azure blue in colour, salinity level is low (11‰) and its surface area is relatively stable. The climatic conditions for both lakes are similar (low rainfall in the range of ), within similar geological setting.

Azuéi's salinity is about one fifth (1/5) the salinity of sea water. A few small rivers flow into the lake.

Fauna and flora
The lake  and its surrounding land are  habitat for flora and fauna of several endemic species, including invertebrates, fishes and reptiles. This endemism is also common to the twin lakes, due to proximity and common history.

Fauna

The lake supports over 100 species of waterfowl (including flamingos), as well as American crocodiles; fresh water species of turtle, including the Hispaniolan slider (Trachemys decorata) and rhinoceros iguana (Cyclura cornuta). Some fishes, such as tilapia, are also found. Its recognized importance is as a breeding, passage and wintering area for numerous bird species: as many as 300–400 breeding pairs of wading birds in the Ciconiiformes can be found in the eastern zone of the lagoon. Important avian raptor species of the lake include the osprey (Pandion haliaetus).

American crocodiles
American crocodiles are found in the lake, and have instilled fear among the local community. It is one factor responsible for the poor development of the lake as an ecotourism project. Extensive studies have been reported on this species of crocodile, as opposed to the Central American Crocodylus moreletii and the South American Crocodylus intermedius.

C. acutus is widely distributed in the coastal region of the Neotropics; however, it is assumed to be surviving on the island of Hispaniola only in the saltwater lakes of Étang Saumâtre and Enriquillo. In 1984, there were estimated to be more than 400 individuals in and around Étang Saumâtre. It is also reported that this population is nearing extirpation, due to excessive hunting and poaching.

The lake is known for the high concentration of crocodiles at 9.6/km in certain zones, with average density of 6.3/km for all crocodile size classes. In the rocky shores, the density was reported to be 0.2/km. They are found in shallow water zones also and feed on cichlids (Nandopsis haitiensis). They remain mostly at the bottom of the lake and during bird nesting season they are found around a heron rookery to catch falling eggs of birds. Their foraging techniques vary from an active to a passive mode, and they forage on non-aquatic invertebrates and also odonate larvae. Birds and fish (Cichilidae) are the common items of their diet. Adults also eat domestic animals such as dogs and goats, and turtles.

Aquatic fauna
Aquatic fauna of the lake consists of small Poeciliidae (Gambusia dominicensis , Limia melanonotata , Limia nigrofasciata ) and cichlids (Nandopsis haitiensis). In the past, 17,000 mirror carp fingerlings and 50,000 Tilapia mossambica fingerlings (a figure of 6,000 is  also mentioned) were reportedly stocked in the lake. Fish productivity figures of the lake are not available. However, the actual catches are reported to be small, as fishing is done only on a small scale. Boats do not ply the lagoon; fishing methods are primitive and no nets are used. Ducks are hunted for food as well.

Flora
The lake is in the region of dry subtropical forest and hence the vegetation around the lake is sparse, with cacti and scrub-type shrubs. Typical vegetation consists of dry-forest plants endemic to the island of Hispaniola. They include trees, shrubs and cacti: caguey (Neoabbottia paniculata), melon espinoso (Melocactus lemairei), palo blanco (Croton poitaei), pitahaya (Harrisia nashii) and oreganillo (Lantana cifferiana).

The lagoon itself has several species of algae. In the fringes of the lake, Conocarpus erectus are reported and Typha domingensis are seen in the marshy region and fresh water streams and canals that have inlet into the lake. The lake has halophytic algae laid out as mattresses growing on its lake bed. Buttonwood mangroves (Conocorpus erectus) trees have large growth in the periphery of the lake. These are felled extensively to make charcoal.

Threats to the lake
Deforestation and soil erosion have occurred and are occurring in the catchment of Lake Azuéi. Its water level has remained relatively stable. Increased levels of eutrophication in the form of increased growth of algae have been noted due to urban growth which is chiefly in Fonds Parisien. During heavy afternoon winds deposit periodically dropped or dumped plastics from the shore. Publicly taxed waste disposal and management rarely operate around the lake, an area which also has little law enforcement of minor littering.

Conservation measures
Haiti and the Dominican Republic and many international agencies are aware of the status of the two water bodies and the catchments drained by them. While Lago Enriquillo in the Dominican Republic has become the first Dominican Ramsar Site and is also a national park since 1996, its twin lake, the Etang Saumâtre has only been studied and is yet to receive the constructive attention for conservation of its American crocodiles and to promote ecotourism in general. However, a transboundary environmental program covering the watershed of the two lakes has been identified by the two governments to jointly initiate measures to improve the condition of the lakes and their respective catchments. This team, with professionals drawn from both countries, and with financial support from the European Union, could ensure that steps are taken to “create wise use practices for both lakes and their corresponding watersheds”.

References

Sources

 "Saumâtre, Étang." The Columbia Gazetteer of North America. Columbia University Press: 2000.

Lakes of the Dominican Republic
Lakes of Haiti
Dominican Republic–Haiti border
International lakes of North America